is a former Japanese sprinter who specialised in the 400 metres.

His personal best time was 45.18 seconds, achieved in the 2003 National Sports Festival of Japan in Fukuroi. This is the current Japanese junior record.

Personal bests

Records
400 metres
Current Japanese junior record holder - 45.18 s (Fukuroi, 29 October 2003)
4×400 m relay
Current Japanese university record holder - 3:03.20 s (relay leg: 3rd) (İzmir, 20 August 2005)

 with Kazunori Ōta, Yoshihiro Horigome, and Kenji Narisako

International competition record

References

External links
 
 
 Yūki Yamaguchi at JAAF 

1984 births
Living people
Tokai University alumni
Sportspeople from Kyoto Prefecture
Japanese male sprinters
Olympic athletes of Japan
Athletes (track and field) at the 2004 Summer Olympics
Athletes (track and field) at the 2006 Asian Games
World Athletics Championships athletes for Japan
Universiade medalists in athletics (track and field)
Universiade silver medalists for Japan
Universiade bronze medalists for Japan
Asian Games competitors for Japan
People from Maizuru
Medalists at the 2005 Summer Universiade